Giuseppe Madini (16 July 1923 – 23 October 1998) was an Italian professional football player.

1923 births
1998 deaths
A.C. Monza players
Association football midfielders
Inter Milan players
Italian footballers
Mantova 1911 players
Serie A players
S.S.D. Sanremese Calcio players
U.S. Lecce players
S.S.D. Varese Calcio players
U.S. Imperia 1923 players
Vigevano Calcio players